The 1973 Western Kentucky football team represented Western Kentucky University during the inaugural 1973 NCAA Division II football season. The team came off an 7–3 record from the prior season and was led by coach Jimmy Feix. They finished the regular season undefeated and won the Ohio Valley Conference championship. The Hilltoppers made the initial NCAA Division II Football Championship, winning their first two playoff games, including a win over Grambling in the Grantland Rice Bowl, before falling in the championship game to Louisiana Tech in the Camellia Bowl. Their rankings in the final polls were UPI 2 and AP 3. 

This team was one of the best in school history, set a school record for victories, and finished ranked 1st in NCAA Division II in Scoring Offense.  The roster included future NFL players Virgil Livers, John Bushong, David Carter, Rick Caswell, Clarence “Jazz” Jackson, and Mike McCoy.  Porter Williams and David Nollner were named to All American teams, Lonnie Schuster was named OVC Defensive Player of the Year, and Feix OVC Coach of the Year.  The All OVC team included Bushong, Jackson, Charlie Johnson, McCoy, Bob Morehead, Nollner, Schuster, Aundra Skiles, and Williams.  The coaching staff included future NFL coach Romeo Crennel.

Schedule

References

Western Kentucky
Western Kentucky Hilltoppers football seasons
Ohio Valley Conference football champion seasons
Grantland Rice Bowl champion seasons
Western Kentucky Hilltoppers football